Scripps-Booth was a United States automobile marque based in Detroit, Michigan. Established by James Scripps Booth in 1913, Scripps-Booth Company produced motor vehicles and was later acquired by General Motors, becoming a division of it, until the brand was discontinued in 1923.

History
The company was founded by artist and engineer James Scripps Booth (of the Scripps publishing family), who also built the Bi-Autogo.  Although the company's first models were cyclecars, Scripps-Booth later produced a "luxurious light car" intended for the luxury market.  Designed by William B. Stout, the Model C went on sale in 1915.  James Booth next developed a sporting version called Vitesse using the Allanson P. Bush designed Ferro V8, to compete with Mercer and Stutz.  The roadster idea was vetoed by company directors and the engine was used in the four-seater Model D instead    About one-third of Model C production had been shipped to Europe and Scripps-Booth smaller luxury cars were popular in export markets.

Reliability issues with the Sterling engine in early cars caused the engine to be changed to a Chevrolet 490 in the Model G.  James Booth believed the company should build their own engines and when company directors declined to do this, Booth resigned.

In 1916, Scripps-Booth Company consolidated with the Sterling Motor Company to become the publicly traded Scripps-Booth Corporation. By the end of 1917, Scripps-Booth had been purchased by Chevrolet whose founder William C. Durant was also the founding president of Sterling Motor Company.   Billy Durant regained control of General Motors and Scripps-Booth became a division of GM with A. H. Sarver as president.

The Scripps-Booth cars were now built with Oakland chassis and Northway engines.  With the departure of Durant from GM in 1921, Alfred P. Sloan could not find a use for Scripps-Booth in the GM line-up and discontinued the brand name in 1922.  The factory was converted to build Buicks. Approximately 60,000 Scripps-Booths had been produced.

Vehicles
The Vintage Chevrolet Club of America accepts the following Scripps-Booth models:
 Model C Roadster, 1915–17
 Model G Roadster, 1917–19
 Model D 4 Passenger Roadster, 1916–17
 Model H 4 Passenger, 4 Door Touring, 1918

For 1914, Scripps-Booth offered a three-passenger torpedo roadster, powered by a 103in3 (1702 cc) (2⅞×4-inch, 3½×102 mm) 18 hp (13 kW) water-cooled four-cylinder of valve-in-head design with Zenith carburetor and Atwater-Kent automatic spark advance. It featured a 110 in (2794 mm) wheelbase and 30×3½-inch (76×8.8-cm) Houk detachable wire wheels, with three speeds and shaft drive. With complete electrical equipment, from Bijur starter to ignition (on a separate switch from starter) to headlights to Klaxet electric horn (with a button in the steering hub, rather than a bulb) to pushbutton door locks, it sold for US$775, 

The 1916-17 Model D was powered by an overhead valve V8 engine designed by Alanson Brush.

In popular culture
Before marrying the main character in John O'Hara's 1934 novel Appointment in Samarra, a youthful Caroline Walker drives a Scripps-Booth Model C Roadster. The car's unusual seating arrangement, in which "the driver sat a foot or so forward of the other seat, which made kissing an awkward act," is especially noted.

Groucho Marx owned a Scripps-Booth.

See also
 Bi-Autogo

References

External links 
 Bill Cuthbert, "The Machines of James Scripps-Booth," HCCA Horseless Carriage Gazette, Sept-Oct 2014, pp. 26–29
 Sam Medway, Automobile Quarterly, 13(3), 1975
 Scripps-Booth Register - An organization for Scripps-Booth history and preservation of extant cars 
 Scripps-Booth at ConceptCarz
 1913 Scripps-Booth Bi-Autogo, called one of the "Worst Cars of All Time"

Defunct motor vehicle manufacturers of the United States
Motor vehicle manufacturers based in Michigan
Manufacturing companies based in Detroit
Scripps family
Vehicle manufacturing companies established in 1913
Vehicle manufacturing companies disestablished in 1923
1913 establishments in Michigan
1923 disestablishments in Michigan
Chevrolet
General Motors marques
Defunct manufacturing companies based in Michigan
1910s cars
1920s cars
Cyclecars
Brass Era vehicles
Vintage vehicles
Cars introduced in 1913